Tyler Robert Joseph (born December 1, 1988) is an American singer, rapper, musician, songwriter, and record producer. He is best known as the frontman for the musical duo Twenty One Pilots, alongside bandmate Josh Dun. He has been nominated for six Grammy Awards as a member of Twenty One Pilots, of which he has won one.

Early life 
Joseph was born in Columbus, Ohio and has two younger brothers, Zack and Jay Joseph (the latter of whom is also a musician), as well as one sister named Madison Brett. His mother, Kelly Joseph (née Stryker), was a math teacher in the Olentangy school district before being named Olentangy Orange High School's basketball coach in 2013. His father, Christopher Anthony "Chris" Joseph, is of Lebanese descent and was a coach at Worthington Christian High School from 1996 to 2005, as well as being a former school principal.

Joseph was homeschooled in his childhood. His first real exposure to music was the Christian rap rock group DC Talk. 

Joseph played basketball from a very young age and went on to play point guard for Worthington Christian. In 2008, the varsity basketball team placed second in the Division IV state tournament. Future Twenty One Pilots bassist Nick Thomas also played on the same team with Joseph, the pair having performed "The Star-Spangled Banner" together at one of their games.

In 2007, Joseph began uploading short comedic skits and videos to a YouTube channel named "slushieguys". The channel currently has over 124 thousand subscribers as of January 2023, despite not uploading any content since 2013.

After seeing a songwriter perform at a High Street Club, he rejected an opportunity to play basketball at Otterbein University along with a scholarship to the university. He began playing music after finding an old keyboard in his closet, a Christmas gift from his mother, and began to mimick various radio melodies. From around 2007 to 2008, Joseph recorded a solo project titled No Phun Intended in his basement. It was later revealed that Thomas contributed guitar to several songs on the album.

Among Joseph's first performances with Twenty One Pilots, he recounts that his mother would often stand outside of Ohio State University giving away tickets to his shows. "She'd be like, 'Come see my son play music'", Joseph says.

Career

Twenty One Pilots 

Twenty One Pilots was formed in 2009 in Columbus, Ohio and consisted of frontman Tyler Joseph, bassist Nick Thomas, and drummer Chris Salih; the latter two left the band in 2011.

On December 29, 2009, they released their debut, self-titled album and began touring Ohio, followed by their second album, Regional at Best in 2011, which consisted only of Joseph and newly-recruited drummer Josh Dun.

Twenty One Pilots' third full-length album, Vessel, was released on January 8, 2013. They also embarked on a tour in support of the album, in which they named the "Quiet Is Violent World Tour".

On March 17, 2015, the band announced their fourth album's title, Blurryface, and unveiled its track listing and release date. The band's fans crashed their website attempting to pre-order the album. The album was released on May 17, 2015, two days ahead of its intended release date. Joseph and drummer Josh Dun embarked on two international tours in 2015 and 2016: the Blurryface Tour and Emotional Roadshow World Tour. At the 59th Annual Grammy Awards, the duo won the award for Best Pop Duo/Group Performance. 

On July 11, 2018, the band announced the release date of their fifth studio album, Trench, which was released on October 5, 2018. A world tour, called The Bandito Tour, began on October 16, 2018, as well. On July 25, 2018, a music video for the song "Nico and the Niners" was released, as a second addition to a three part music video series, regarding Tyler Joseph's fictional city, "Dema". A 10-second snippet of the song "My Blood" was played at the end of a commercial for Trench during the 2018 VMAs on August 20. On August 27, 2018, a Twitter user leaked the full song onto his Twitter account in low quality, after they found that it could be played on their Apple HomePod. The leak was confirmed real when the band made the song available on streaming services later that day as the album's fourth single. The audio was uploaded onto YouTube on the same day, which shows singer Tyler Joseph in his home studio playing the song's bass line. A music video for the song was released on October 5, 2018, the day of the album's release.

On April 9, 2020, the band released a new single "Level of Concern". The song's lyrics reference the anxiety during the COVID-19 pandemic, also, the accompanying music video for the track was filmed in Joseph and Dun's homes while they were under lockdown due to the U.S. state and local government responses to the COVID-19 pandemic. Joseph directed a portion of the song's proceeds to Crew Nation, a charity for live music crews who cannot be paid during the international quarantine.

On December 8, 2020, Twenty One Pilots released a Christmas song, titled "Christmas Saves the Year", during a Twitch livestream hosted by Joseph. Originally, Joseph was reluctant to write a Christmas song, although he said that he was inspired by the fact he was "experiencing Christmas through a little girl's perspective." The sound of the track was inspired by a musical instrument called the Mellotron.

The duo's sixth studio album, Scaled and Icy, was released on May 21, 2021.

Other ventures 

Tyler Joseph had a solo project before starting Twenty One Pilots where he released a full-length album titled No Phun Intended. The release was available for listening purposes on his PureVolume account until 2018, when the music service shut down. The album was recorded in Joseph's senior year of high school from 2007 to 2008, in his basement. The song "Save" off the release, was redone and released as a free download for some time on Twenty One Pilots' official website before it was then pulled. 

In 2010, Joseph was featured in the song "Live" by the hip hop artist and rapper Joseph Michael Langston (better known by his stage name Jocef, or sometimes as Jocef Michael), who is a friend of Joseph's from college, along with two other rappers, Juda and Alon. The song is the opening track to Jocef's debut album, In Search of: L.O.V.E. The track was co-written by Tyler Joseph and Jocef. Jocef eventually returned the favor a year later by being featured on the song "Be Concerned" off of Twenty One Pilots' 2011 album Regional at Best.

In 2011, Joseph was performed a leading role in Five14 Church's three episode mockumentary titled "The (moderately inspiring tale of the) Longboard Rodeo Tango". According to the mockumentary, Joseph was an intern at the church at the time.

In 2012, Joseph was featured in an internet-use awareness video titled "What's Your Story?" The video was produced and directed by Mark C. Eshleman, a regular collaborator for Twenty One Pilots, for Trend Micro's annual Where Are You Contest. The room used in the video is the same room in which the original music video for "House of Gold" was filmed.

On December 24, 2013, Christmas Eve, Joseph participated and sang "O Come, O Come, Emmanuel" at Five14 Church's Christmas With the Stars in New Albany, Ohio. The official video of the performance was uploaded to YouTube on February 14, 2014. He also performed a magic segment with the church's host and emcee David McCreary for the show.

Joseph also contributed to a few tracks for Five14 Church's worship album Clear by the gospel rock band New Albany Music led by Travis Whittaker "Whittaker". Joseph appears on four tracks out of thirteen in total. Additionally, another single was recorded called "Dead Come Alive".

In December 2014, Joseph contributed backing vocals to the song "Sickly Sweet Holidays" by Dallon Weekes (then-bassist of Panic! at the Disco). Joseph initially had an entire verse in the song, but it was excluded due to Joseph's label.

Joseph assisted in much of the production of singer Shania Twain's sixth studio album Queen of Me, and is a writer on the last song, "The Hardest Stone" as well.

Personal life 

In 2014, within regards to religion, Joseph said: 

Joseph is a supporter of the Black Lives Matter movement. He is also an ally of the LGBT+ community.

Joseph has a three-part tattoo that represents "something that saved his life". Though it is assumed it deals with his Christian faith, Joseph has been specific about the fact that he does not want the meaning of his tattoos spread across the internet. However, he has stated a few times that he is willing to tell people one-on-one if they decide to ask him in person. They received it on stage during their hometown show at the Lifestyle Communities Pavilion on April 26, 2013. Joseph's is located on his right bicep and Dun's is located on his neck behind his right ear. Joseph is a fan of the intercollegiate athletic collective, the Ohio State Buckeyes.

In mid-January 2015, Tyler Joseph served at former bandmate Chris Salih's wedding as an attendant, alongside Twenty One Pilots producer Mark Eshleman.

Joseph married Jenna Black on March 28, 2015, after they became engaged on July 8, 2014. On September 7, 2019, Joseph and his wife announced that they were expecting a child. Their daughter was born on February 9, 2020. On September 12, 2021, during a performance at the MTV VMA's, Joseph announced that he and his wife were expecting their second child. Their second daughter was born on April 8, 2022.

Discography

Solo

No Phun Intended
Before assembling the band Twenty One Pilots, between 2007 and 2008, Tyler Joseph recorded a variety of songs in his basement. On November 30, 2008, during his senior year of high school, Joseph uploaded six of these songs to his PureVolume account, calling the release No Phun Intended. 

Some of Joseph's early music has been reworked into Twenty One Pilots recordings. It was later revealed that aside from Joseph, Twenty One Pilots bassist Nick Thomas contributed guitar to several songs. 

In 2015, the project became unavailable, but the No Phun Intended tracks and many other songs from this time period were collected by fans and assorted into compilations. On July 2, 2018, Joseph's song "Going Down" and an untitled demo surfaced on the internet, many years after the initial discovery of No Phun Intended.

Notes

With other artists

Twenty One Pilots

 Twenty One Pilots (2009)
 Regional at Best (2011)
 Vessel (2013)
 Blurryface (2015)
 Trench (2018)
 Scaled and Icy (2021)

Poetry

Awards and nominations

See also 
 Twenty One Pilots
 Josh Dun
 List of songs recorded by Twenty One Pilots

References

External links 

 
 
Tyler Joseph on Twitter

1988 births
Living people
American Christians
American male singers
Twenty One Pilots members
Fueled by Ramen artists
Rappers from Columbus, Ohio
American people of Lebanese descent
Musicians from Columbus, Ohio
Basketball players from Ohio
Record producers from Ohio
Singers from Ohio
Songwriters from Ohio
21st-century American rappers
American men's basketball players
American male pianists
American male guitarists
American accordionists
American keyboardists
American poets
Electropop musicians
American rock musicians
American pop musicians
American hip hop musicians
American male rappers
American lyricists